Music Trance is a studio album by Ben E. King, released in 1980.

It contains only seven tracks; however, the tracks are some of the longest he ever recorded.  As a result, the length of the album is longer than many of his others.

The single "Music Trance" peaked at No. 29 on the Billboard Hot R&B/Hip-Hop Songs chart. The B-side contained "And This Is Love". The album peaked at No. 73 on the Billboard Top R&B Albums chart.

Production
The production was shared by Mass Production and Bert DeCoteaux.

Track listing

"Music Trance" (Ben E. King) [5:56]
"And This Is Love" (Barrie Palmer, Janet Alhanti) [4:07]
"Touched By Your Love" (Ben E. King, Bert DeCoteaux, Melvin Shaw) [5:39]
"You've Only Got One Chance To Be Young" (Ben E. King, Melvin Shaw) [6:16]
"Hired Gun" (Gregory McCoy, James Drumgole) [6:11]
"Everyday" (Gregory McCoy, James Drumgole) [5:35]
"Work That Body" (Tyrone Williams) [6:20]

References

Ben E. King albums
1980 albums
Atlantic Records albums